Peter Bakare (born 2 July 1989) is a British volleyball player. Born in London, England, he competed for Great Britain in the men's tournament at the 2012 Summer Olympics.

Career
After playing basketball in college, Bakare was invited by his coach to play volleyball. After representing his college team, he was offered a professional contract in Holland with Landstede. Following his participation in the 2012 Olympic Games, he competed with Team Northumbria.

Personal life
Bakare was raised in a single-parent family, relying on a local friary for food and other support. He studied animation at Sheffield Hallam University and became involved in scriptwriting, working on TV show Skins. He later worked in advertising and visited schools as part of the Sport for Schools programme.

His cousin Dami also played on the 2012 Olympic team.

References

English men's volleyball players
Volleyball players at the 2012 Summer Olympics
Olympic volleyball players of Great Britain
1989 births
Living people
Sportspeople from London